= Gudikatti =

Coordinates: 15°39′N 74°57′E

- Village
- Interactive map of Gudikatti
- Country: India
- State: Karnataka
- District: Belgaum
- Talukas: Bailhongal

Languages
  - Official: Kannada
- Time zone: UTC+5:30 (IST)
- Nearest city: Belavadi, DODAWAD

Gudikatti is a village in Belgaum district in the southern state of Karnataka, India.

There is an old Kannada script written on a stone, which is placed in the village temple.
